Lego Rock Raiders is a video game developed by Data Design Interactive and published by Lego Media for Microsoft Windows and PlayStation. It is based on the Lego theme of the same name. The Windows version was released in 1999, while a differently built game for PlayStation was released in 2000.

Gameplay

Windows version
The Windows version is a real-time strategy game similar to Dungeon Keeper, and was the first video game for the Rock Raiders theme. The game opens with optional training missions and one actual mission unlocked. Most missions require the player to collect a certain amount of Energy Crystals, the required amount starts low but gradually gets higher in later missions. Some missions require the player to locate Rock Raiders that have been trapped in landslides, or to find certain pieces of equipment and bring it back to their base. One of the game's features is the Priority Menu. With this menu, the player can set what order Rock Raiders carry out their tasks. For example, the player can set whether Rock Raiders should collect Energy Crystals or Lego Ore first.

At the end of each mission, Chief evaluates the player's work, examining various aspects of the mission. With all these taken into consideration, Chief gives a mission rating percentage.

There are twenty-five missions total, each of them is in either a rock, lava/volcanic or ice cavern environment. It is not necessary to complete every mission with 100%, or even complete all the missions, to complete the campaign, however, the player will unlock a "better" ending cutscene by completing the campaign in full.

PlayStation version 
Unlike the Windows version, the PlayStation version is an action and strategy game, in which the player controls a character instead of just commanding a squad. While the former was centered on constructing a base and mining, the latter centers on exploring.

Most missions require the player to collect a certain amount of Energy Crystals, while some missions require the player to rescue Rock Raiders that have been trapped by landslides. There are eighteen campaign missions, and six multiplayer missions, all completely different between the NTSC and PAL versions of the game. The PAL version also including three bonus missions that are accessible after the campaign is completely finished, and twelve additional multiplayer missions reusing levels from the main campaign. Rather than a percentage, at the end of each mission you receive either a bronze medal (minimum required objectives complete), a silver medal (most objectives complete), or a gold medal (all objectives complete in the required time).

Reception 

The game received mixed reviews on both platforms according to the review aggregation website GameRankings.

References

External links 
 

1999 video games
Action-adventure games
Data Design Interactive games
Rock Raiders (video game)
Multiplayer and single-player video games
PlayStation (console) games
Real-time strategy video games
Video games developed in the United Kingdom
Video games with alternative versions
Windows games